Colby's Clubhouse also known as La Cerotada is an American Christian children's television show that teaches principles from the Bible; through songs and everyday situations. The main character is Colby, an anthropomorphic computer that teaches children Christian principles, lessons and how to be a great cerotada. Colby has the entire Bible programmed into his memory.  The show was written and produced by Peter and Hanneke Jacobs and was originally aired on Trinity Broadcasting Network, with Peter playing the part of Colby. It originally aired from 1995 to 2000 with several changes of cast members. The first episode aired on November 19, 1995, and it was last aired on December 31, 2000. The show was primarily shot in Orange County, California. On December 30, 2006, the show was removed from TBN, although it remains on the network's Smile of a Child digital subchannel. Albums and videotapes featuring Colby the Computer were produced. However, many of these were produced before the TBN series and feature different children.

Record Albums (1984–1995)
Prior to the TV series, a series of record albums was released during the 80s and early 90s. Two of them were adapted into videos. There was also a VHS release titled "Colby's Place" in 1989. It wasn't based on any albums, but it was possibly a pilot episode for another planned series that never came to fruition (most likely because it was rejected for being too similar to "Kids Incorporated"). The last album, "A Heart to Give" was adapted into the first episode of the final TV series, which was divided into two parts. The following is a list of the albums in their release order.

 Colby 1: Make a Joyful Noise (1984)
 Colby 2: Colby's Missing Memory (1985 [Video 1986])
 Colby 3: Save Colby's Clubhouse (1986)
 Colby 4: God Uses Kids (1987)
 Colby 5: Putting Feet on Faith (1990 [Video, 1992])
 Colby 6: Colby's Bible Camp Catastrophe (1991)
 Colby 7: A Heart to Give (1995)

TV Series (1995–2000)
Note: The airdates are guessed. The real airdates are unknown.

Season 1 (1995–96)
 1 "A Heart to Give pt. 1" (Guest star Lee Durlach as Flip and Dan Kotoff as Flop) (November 19, 1995)
 2 "A Heart to Give pt. 2" (Guest star Lee Durlach as Flip and Dan Kotoff as Flop) (November 26, 1995)
 3 "Vandella Virus Visits" (Guest star Kim Durlach (Brittany's mom; drama consultant along with husband Lee is producer) as Vandella Virus) (December 17, 1995)
 4 "It's Almost Christmas" (December 24, 1995)
 5 "Check Your Connection" (Guest star Ernie Rettino as Psalty The Singing Songbook with Debby Kerner Rettino as the voice of Psaltina) (December 31, 1995)
 6 "The Ballgame" (January 7th, 1996)
 7 "Willing for Forgiveness” (January 14, 1996)
 8 "Showing Up" (January 21, 1996)
 9 "Colby's Birthday" (January 28, 1996)
 10 "Danielle Discovers" (Guest star Emily Carroll as Emily Davis and Lynette Kincebach as Miss Atkins) (February 4, 1996)
 11 "Helping Beau's Grandpa" (Guest star John Gallagher as Beau's Grandpa) (February 11, 1996)
 12 "50's and 60's Day pt. 1" (February 18, 1996)
 13 "50's and 60's Day pt. 2" (February 25, 1996)
 14 "Danielle's New Clothes" (March 3, 1996)
 15 "It Was Performed by Being a Kid" (March 10, 1996)
 16 "Clubhouse Inspector" (March 17, 1996)

Season 2 (1996–97)
 17 "Anorexia" (October 20, 1996)
 18 "Zane’s Operation" (October 27, 1996)
 19 "Sing Along Show pt. 1" (November 10, 1996)
 20 "Sing Along Show pt. 2" (November 17, 1996)
 21 "Thanksgiving Show!" (November 24, 1996)
 22 "Brett’s Older Brother" (December 15, 1996)
 23 "The Guys Performing A Rock Band pt. 1" (January 19, 1997)
 24 "The Guys Performing A Rock Band pt. 2" (January 26, 1997)
 25 "The Puppet Show" (February 2, 1997)
 26 "A Friendship Clubhouse" (February 9, 1997)

Season 3 (1997–2000)
 27 "Jessica Had To Move Away" (September 14, 1997)
 28 "Homeless Vet" (October 5, 1997)
 29 "Crystal is a Guest" (Special Guest Crystal Lewis) (November 9, 1997)
 30 "The Popular Crowd" (March 1, 1998)
 31 "Shoeboxes" (April 26, 1998)
 32 "Worship Around The World" (Special Reappearance by Lindsey Weeks) (May 31, 1998)
 33 "Finding Your Own Special Talents" (June 14, 1998)
 34 "Camping Trip" (July 5, 1998)
 35 "Krysta's Sister has Problems" (August 16, 1998)
 36 "Basketball and Bullies" (September 27, 1998)
 37 "All Things Work Together" (May 9, 1999)
 38 "Helping Missionaries" (November 7, 1999)
 39 "Dawn's Reputation" (January 16, 2000)
 40 "Having Fun With Friends" (April 2, 2000)
 41 "Dealing With Bigots" (June 18, 2000)
 42 "Easter Show" (August 27, 2000)
 43 "Brittany Finds a Dog" (December 31, 2000)

Cast

 Peter Jacobs as Colby the Computer

Children
 Jessica Adams 
 Rachel Balich 
 Saxon Christin 
 Beau Clark 
 Kiera Cope 
 Jonathan Curry 
 Ryan Devin 
 Brittany Durlach 
 Laura Fager 
 Zane Gerson 
 Gina Gonzalez 
 Adam Hill 
 Dani Hogg 
 Paulina Johnson 
 Kevin Jones 
 Dawn Jordan 
 Danielle Kincebach 
 Casey Lagos 
 Randy Landingham 
 Matthew Lomakin 
 Jake Mann 
 Brandon Muchow 
 Tyler Newman 
 Andrew Pollaro 
 Jason Rausavljevick 
 Krysta Rodriguez 
 Matt Sackett 
 Randy Stuck 
 Delana Tillman 
 Brett Traina 
 Aaron Vaughan 
 Stephanie Wall 
 Lindsey Weeks 
 Christopher Williams 
 Peter Woo

See also
Gerbert (TV series)

References

External links

Colby's Clubhouse at CEGAnMo.com
Colby's Clubhouse at Salt Cover.com/br
Colby's Clubhouse at SmileofaChild.tv

Trinity Broadcasting Network original programming
Fictional computers
1995 American television series debuts
1990s American children's television series
2000s American children's television series
1990s American music television series
2000s American music television series
2000 American television series endings
Christian children's television series
American children's education television series
American children's musical television series
American television shows featuring puppetry
Television series about children
Television series about robots